is a railway station located in the city of Ōdate, Akita Prefecture, Japan, operated by the East Japan Railway Company (JR East).

Lines

Station layout
The station consists of two opposed side platforms connected by a footbridge. The station is unattended.

Platforms

History
Shimokawazoi Station was opened on May 1, 1951 as a station on the Japan National Railways (JNR), serving the now-defunct village of Shimokawazoi, Akita. The station was absorbed into the JR East network upon the privatization of the JNR on April 1, 1987.

Surrounding area

See also
 List of Railway Stations in Japan

External links
 JR East Station information 

Railway stations in Japan opened in 1954
Railway stations in Akita Prefecture
Ōu Main Line
Ōdate